Seeker is a 2005 science fiction novel by American writer Jack McDevitt. It won the Nebula Award for Best Novel in 2006.

Synopsis
The story is set approximately 10,000 years in the future, after civilization has expanded to inhabit countless worlds. Alex Benedict, dealer in antiques, and his partner Chase Kolpath are astroarchaeologists involved in the examination of abandoned bases and deserted space-craft in search of valuable items.

Alex is approached by a mysterious woman who asks him to ascertain the value of a strange cup riddled with archaic symbols. They discover that the cup is a 9,000-year-old relic from one of the first faster-than-light vehicles built, the Seeker. This was a colony ship crewed by a faction known as the "Margolians" who were fleeing the then-oppressive society of Earth in hopes of establishing a free world. Records indicate that they succeeded, as the Seeker made several voyages, but they kept the location of their colony world a secret.

Alex and Chase discover who brought this cup back with some insight. By retracing the route of these long-forgotten space explorers, they begin to get an idea of where the Seeker was found. Excitedly, they set off in hopes of finding the colony of "Margolia".

Recognition
 Nebula Award winner, 2006
 John W. Campbell Award nominee, 2006
 Southeastern Science Fiction Achievement Award winner, 2006

References

External links
 Jack McDevitt's site
 Seeker at Worlds Without End

2005 American novels
2005 science fiction novels
American science fiction novels
Nebula Award for Best Novel-winning works
Novels by Jack McDevitt
Ace Books books